Lakay (subtitled A True to Life Story of P/Col Juanito Lagasca) is a 1992 Filipino action film directed by Nilo Saez, written by Jose Carreon, and starring Fernando Poe Jr. as the titular police colonel. It also stars Charo Santos, Rina Reyes, Efren Reyes Jr., Jose Romulo, Philip Gamboa, Romy Diaz, Madel Locsin, Flexi Sarte, and Fredmoore De Los Santos. Produced by GP Films, the film was released on November 4, 1992.

Cast

Fernando Poe Jr. as Juanito "Lakay" Lagasca
Charo Santos
Rina Reyes
Efren Reyes Jr. as Waway
Jose Romulo
Philip Gamboa
Romy Diaz
Madel Locsin
Flexi Sarte
Fredmoore De Los Santos
Ernie David
Ronnie Olivar
Avel Monado
Efren Belardo
Bert Garon
Buddy Dator
Rene Hawkins
Danny Riel
Jess Vargas
Tirso Mediavillo
Mario Cavero
Renato Tanchinco
Lucita Soriano
Odette Khan
Marithez Samson
Naty Santiago
Ramon D Salva as Congressman
Berting Labra
Rommel Valdez
Vic Varrion
Eddie Arenas
Michael Murray
Nanding Fernandez
Ernie Ortega
Hermino "Butch" Bautista
Alfred Salta
Jimmy Reyes
Bebeng Amora
Cris Daluz
Ernie Forte
Nemie Gutierrez
Tony Tacorda
Nonoy De Guzman
Johnny Vicar

Production

Retired officer Juanito Lagasca gave his approval to a film adaptation of his story once George Pascual of GP Films assured that Fernando Poe Jr. was cast in his role.

Release
Lakay was released in the Philippines on November 4, 1992.

References

External links

1992 films
1992 action films
Action films based on actual events
Filipino-language films
Philippine action films